Michael Matus may refer to:

 Michael Matus (canoeist), Czechoslovak sprint canoeist
 Michael Matus (actor), British actor